NGC 1907 is an open star cluster around 4,500 light years from Earth. It contains around 30 stars and is over 500 million years old. With a magnitude of 8.2 it is visible in the constellation Auriga.

Sources 
Kopernik.org
Glyphweb.com

External links
 
 

Auriga (constellation)
Open clusters
1907